Ju Dou is a 1990 film directed by Zhang Yimou and Yang Fengliang and starring Gong Li as the title character. It is notable for being printed in vivid Technicolor long after the process had been abandoned in the United States. It was also the first Chinese film to be nominated for an Academy Award for Best Foreign Language Film, in 1990.

The film is a tragedy, focusing on the character of Ju Dou, a beautiful young woman who has been sold as a wife to Jinshan, an old cloth dyer.

The film was banned for a few years in China, but the ban has since been lifted. The Chinese government gave permission for its viewing in July 1992.

The story originates from the novel Fuxi, Fuxi (伏羲伏羲) by Liu Heng.

Plot
Ju Dou takes place in the early 20th century in rural China. Yang Tianqing (Li Baotian) is returning from a trek to sell silk for his adoptive uncle, Yang Jinshan (Li Wei). Jinshan, whose trade is dyeing fabrics, is known for his cruelty. After Tianqing returns, another worker is fired by Jinshan. While going away this worker informs Tianqing that Jinshan has recently purchased a new wife, having beaten two previous wives to death after they failed to produce a son, the cruel irony being that Jinshan is in fact impotent.

Upon meeting the wife, Ju Dou (Gong Li), Tianqing is enamored with her. At night, Jinshan tortures Ju Dou. Tianqing discovers Ju Dou's bathing area and spies on her. He does not know that Ju Dou knows he is there. Although Tianqing watches luridly at first, Ju Dou transforms the meaning of his gaze by exposing her bruises and sobbing, forcing him to see her as a human being rather than just a sexual object.

Soon, the two are unable to control their passion any longer and engage in sex. When Ju Dou discovers she is pregnant with Tianqing's child, she and Tianqing pretend that the child is Jinshan's. Jinshan suffers a stroke that leaves him paralyzed from the waist down. After Ju Dou tells him the child is not his, he attempts to kill the child and burn down the house. Tianqing ties up Jinshan and hoists him in a barrel, leaving him dangling helplessly, a bitter bystander to his usurpation. Knowing that society would never accept her infidelity, Ju Dou goes to a nunnery to terminate another pregnancy. Jinshan continues to influence the life of the child he named Tianbai and when the child calls Jinshan "Father," Jinshan accepts this as psychological revenge on his wife and nephew. One day, Jinshan falls into the dye vat and drowns and a funeral is held for him.

Seven years later, Ju Dou and Tianqing still run the dye operation but Tianbai (Zheng Ji'an) is now a rage-filled teenager. Rumors of his parents' infidelities drive him to nearly kill a local gossiper. Ju Dou reveals the truth to her son in a fit of rage. She and Tianqing decide to have one last affair and grow weak after falling asleep in a cellar with little air. Upon discovering his parents resting in the cellar after their tryst, Tianbai drags them out - still weak and unable to awaken - and drowns Tianqing. Ju Dou then burns the mill down as the film ends.

Adaptation
In the original novel Tianqing is the biological nephew of Jinshan and the story itself is about incest by affinity. The makers of the film version decided not to use the incest angle. In the film, Tianqing and Jinshan are not biologically related, and Ju Dou only begins her relationship with Tianqing after learning that he and Jinshan are not related.

Cast
Gong Li, as Ju Dou (S: 菊豆, T: 菊荳, P: Jú Dòu);
Li Baotian, as Yang Tianqing (S: 杨天青, T: 楊天青, P: Yáng Tiānqīng), Ju Dou's lover and Yang Jinshan's adopted nephew;
Li Wei, as Yang Jinshan (S: 杨金山, T: 楊金山, P: Yáng Jīnshān), the owner of the dye mill and Ju Dou's husband;
Yi Zhang, as Yang Tianbai (S: 杨天白, T: 楊天白, P: Yáng Tiānbái) as a child; Ju Dou and Tianqing's son;
Zheng Ji'an, as Tianbai as a youth.

Release and reception
Ju Dou was released by Miramax Films in March 1991.

Awards
Cannes Film Festival, 1990
Luis Buñuel Special Award
Palme d'Or (nominated)
Valladolid International Film Festival, 1990
Golden Spike
Chicago International Film Festival, 1990
Gold Hugo
Norwegian International Film Festival, 1990
Best Foreign Feature Film (Amanda)
63rd Academy Awards, 1991
Best Foreign Language Film (nominated)

Accolades
 Time Out 100 Best Chinese Mainland Films – #21
 Included in The New York Times'''s list of The Best 1000 Movies Ever Made in 2004

DVD releaseJu Dou was initially released on DVD in the United States as an all-region disc on the Pioneer label, Geneon Entertainment, on June 29, 1999. The disc included English subtitles.

The film was re-released by Razor Digital Entertainment on February 14, 2006 as part of the new Zhang Yimou collection to capitalize on Zhang's recent international successes of Hero and House of Flying Daggers''. The new edition was Region 1 and included English, simplified Chinese, and traditional Chinese subtitles. Despite the DVD box stating that the film is presented in widescreen, it is actually presented in full frame.

See also
 List of submissions to the 63rd Academy Awards for Best Foreign Language Film
 List of Chinese submissions for the Academy Award for Best Foreign Language Film

References

Footnotes

Sources

External links

Excerpt

1990 films
1990 romantic drama films
Japanese romantic drama films
Chinese romantic drama films
1990s Mandarin-language films
Films directed by Zhang Yimou
Films with screenplays by Liu Heng
Films based on Chinese novels